Licorice plant is a common name for several plants and may refer to:

Glycyrrhiza glabra, native to Europe and Asia and used in flavoring candy
Helichrysum petiolare, native to southern Africa